John Hore (9 August 1907 – 7 July 1979) was a New Zealand rugby union player. A hooker and prop, Hore represented Otago at a provincial level, and was a member of the New Zealand national side, the All Blacks from 1928 to 1936. He played 45 matches for the All Blacks including 10 internationals. During World War II Hore served as a warrant officer with the 2nd New Zealand Expeditionary Force (NZEF) in the Middle East, and after the end of the war was a selector of the 2nd NZEF "Kiwis" army team that toured Britain.

Hore died in Dunedin in 1979 and his ashes were buried in Andersons Bay Cemetery.

References

1907 births
1979 deaths
Rugby union players from Dunedin
People educated at King Edward Technical College
New Zealand rugby union players
New Zealand international rugby union players
Otago rugby union players
Rugby union props
Rugby union hookers
New Zealand military personnel of World War II
Burials at Andersons Bay Cemetery